"Tender Years" is a song written by American country music artist George Jones and Darrell Edwards. It became Jones' second #1 country hit.

Background
"Tender Years" spent  seven non consecutive weeks at #1 and a total of 32 weeks on the country chart.  "Tender Years" also made it to the Hot 100, peaking at number 76. Like his previous singles "Family Bible" and "Window Up Above," the recording displayed a more mature, restrained vocal approach from the one that had established him on earlier honky tonk hits such as "Why Baby Why" and "White Lightning".  In the liner notes to the 1994 Mercury compilation Cup of Loneliness: The Classic Mercury Years, country music historian Colin Escott argues that "Tender Years" "just about defined the territory he carved out as his own in the years ahead.  'Window Up Above,' 'Color of the Blues,' and 'Accidentally on Purpose' had all hinted at the same direction, but on 'Tender Years' the song, the production, and the performance came together in a statement of soon-to-be classic George Jones."   Music journalist Rich Kienzle concurs, observing in his essay for The Essential George Jones: The Spirit of Country, "Here, his singing voice, which so far had been high and nasal, began to deepen.  His restrained delivery and the smoother, 'Nashville Sound' production (complete with muted accompaniment and a vocal chorus) produced a smoother, but no less expressive George Jones."  Years later Jones would perform the song with Faron Young and Marty Robbins during a segment on Robbins' television show (the video is available on YouTube).

The famous French singer Johnny Hallyday recorded the song during a Nashville session and afterward he recorded a French version Tes Tendres Années.  This French rendition was used as a basis for the 1963 Dutch hit Spiegelbeeld written by Lodewijk Post and sung by Dutch singer Willeke Alberti.

Chart performance

Johnny Hallyday version (in French) 

The song was covered in French by  Johnny Hallyday. His version (titled "Tes tendres années") was released in early 1963 and reached no. 1 in the Netherlands. In Wallonia (French Belgium) his single spent 28 weeks on the chart, peaking at number 2, in Flanders (Dutch Belgium) – 12 weeks peaking at number 9.

Charts

References

George Jones songs
1961 songs
1961 singles
Mercury Records singles
Johnny Hallyday songs